"Hit Da Pavement" is a song by American funk duo 7 Days of Funk. It is the opening track on their eponymous debut studio album in 2013. The song was written by Calvin Broadus and Damon Riddick. Mixed by Shon Lawon and Cole M.G.N., it was produced by Riddick under his stage name Dâm-Funk and the vocals were performed by Broadus under his moniker Snoopzilla. The song features backing vocals from Shon Lawon and Val Young, and additional vocals from Parliament-Funkadelic bassist Bootsy Collins.

Stones Throw Records released "Hit Da Pavement" along with "Faden Away" on a cassingle on December 10, 2013, with both vocal and instrumental versions. The cassette was given away exclusively with the first week's orders of the LP and 45 box set.

Background
Dâm-Funk and Snoopzilla initially got together for an impromptu performance at the opening of The Dogg House at HVW8 Art + Design Gallery in Los Angeles on February 16, 2011. A month after the meeting, the two began to collaborate when Snoop invited Dâm to perform with him at show at the SXSW Music Festival. They forged a mutual admiration; then unexpectedly, Snoop sent Dâm a cryptic SoundCloud message: "I need some of that heat." Months went by and Snoop went to Dâm's house. "Hit Da Pavement" is the first track 7 Days of Funk recorded.

Music video
The music video for "Hit Da Pavement" premiered on VEVO on December 10, 2013. Directed by Henry DeMaio, the video picks up from the house party in the video for the album's lead single "Faden Away".  The retro video finds the West Coast duo driving around the streets of Los Angeles at night with their ladies in Snoop's baby blue Lincoln Continental, and rapping in parking lots.  Along the way, a couple bags of cannabis are purchased from a sidewalk dealer and two ladies get picked up in the Lincoln.

Track listing
Cassingle

45 Box Set

Credits and personnel
Recording
 Recorded at Funkmosphere Lab, Los Angeles, California.
 Mixed at The Compound, Los Angeles, California.
 Mastered at Bernie Grundman Mastering, Hollywood, Los Angeles.

Personnel
 Calvin Broadus – composer, vocals
 Cole M.G.N. – mixing
 Bootsy Collins – additional vocals
 Brian "Big Bass" Gardner – mastering
 Shon Lawon – background vocals, engineering, mixing
 Damon Riddick – instrumentation, production
 Frank Vasquez – additional engineering
 Val Young – background vocals

Release history

References

2013 songs
Snoop Dogg songs
American hip hop songs
Funk songs
7 Days of Funk songs
G-funk songs